Mes Sarcheshmeh was an Iranian football club based in Kerman. This club belonged to the large Kerman Sanat Copper Mining Company and was founded by this company along with several other clubs in 1998.
In the 2010–11 season, Mes Sarcheshmeh was promoted to the Persian Gulf League by placing in the first place of Group 2 of the Azadegan League,But in only season in the Premier League, this team placed last in the Persian Gulf Pro League and was relegated to the Azadegan League.

did In 2013, this club handed over its quota in the Azadegan League to Padideh Khorasan.

Season-by-season

References

Football clubs in Iran
Association football clubs established in 1998